Allium guttatum, spotted garlic, is a species of wild garlic native to  Morocco, Algeria, Tunisia, Libya, Portugal, Spain, France, Italy, Sardinia, Sicily, the Balkan Peninsula, the Aegean Islands, Turkey, Cyprus, Romania, and Ukraine (including Crimea). Described in 1809, by 1819 it was being cultivated in British gardens as an ornamental.

Subspecies
The following subspecies are currently accepted:

Allium guttatum subsp. dalmaticum (A.Kern. ex Janch.) Stearn
Allium guttatum subsp. guttatum
Allium guttatum subsp. kartalkayaense Yild.
Allium guttatum subsp. sardoum (Moris) Stearn
Allium guttatum subsp. tenorei (Parl.) Soldano

References

guttatum
Plants described in 1809